Vernon Nkadimeng (25 June 1958 in Alexandra – 21 May 1985 in Gaborone, Botswana) was a member of the African National Congress who was killed while in exile in Botswana by the apartheid secret police.

Life
He fled South Africa following the 1976 Soweto uprising at the age of 18. He entered the Umkhonto We Sizwe (MK) in Angola, the armed wing of the ANC and soon rose up through the military structures of the MK. He traveled to Czechoslovakia with the MK, where he received specialist military training. On 21 May 1985, Nkadimeng was killed by a car bomb placed by the apartheid police.

References

1958 births
1984 deaths
People from Alexandra, Gauteng
Assassinated South African activists
Assassinated South African people
South African people murdered abroad
People murdered in Botswana
Members of the African National Congress
Deaths by car bomb
Assassinated South African politicians
South African exiles
South African expatriates in Botswana
1980s murders in Botswana
1984 crimes in Botswana
1984 murders in Africa